Julien Pierre (born 31 July 1981) is a French rugby union player for Clermont Auvergne in the Top 14. He plays as a lock.

He won his first cap on France's 2007 tour of New Zealand. He previously played for Bourgoin and La Rochelle.

He was injured in an attack on him and other teammates in July 2014 after visiting a nightclub in Millau.

References

External links
 Clermont Auvergne profile
 France profile
 Rugby: France name 10 new caps to face All Blacks

People from Rodez
1981 births
Living people
France international rugby union players
CS Bourgoin-Jallieu players
ASM Clermont Auvergne players
Stade Rochelais players
Sportspeople from Aveyron
Rugby union locks
Section Paloise players